Ely or ELY may refer to:

Places

Ireland
 Éile, a medieval kingdom commonly anglicised Ely
 Ely Place, Dublin, a street

United Kingdom
 Ely, Cambridgeshire, a cathedral city in Cambridgeshire, England
 Ely Cathedral
 Ely Rural District, a former district surrounding Ely, Cambridgeshire on the west and north
 Isle of Ely, a historic region and former county around the city of Ely
 Diocese of Ely, a Church of England diocese in the Province of Canterbury
 Ely Place, a road in London
 Ely, Cardiff, a suburb of west Cardiff, Wales
 Ely (Cardiff electoral ward)
 River Ely, a river in Wales that flows through Cardiff

United States
 Ely, Iowa, a city
 Ely, Minnesota, a city
 Ely, Missouri, an unincorporated community
 Ely, Nevada, a city and county seat
 Ely, New Jersey, an unincorporated community
 Ely, Virginia, an unincorporated community
 Ely Township, Michigan
 Norton, Yolo County, California, formerly Ely
 Ely, a village belonging to Fairlee, Vermont
 Ely Range, a mountain range in Nevada

Codes
 El Al, an airline with ICAO airline designator ELY
 Ely Airport, also known as Yelland Field, IATA code ELY
 Ely railway station, an English railway station that has National Rail code ELY
 Elyria (Amtrak station), an Ohio rail station, which has Amtrak station code ELY
 Callaway Golf, a company that has New York Stock Exchange code ELY

In education
 Ely Professor of Divinity, a professorship at the University of Cambridge
 Ely College, Ely, Cambridgeshire, United Kingdom
 King's Ely, Ely, Cambridgeshire, United Kingdom
 Ely Theological College, Ely, Cambridgeshire
 Ely High School for Girls, Ely, Cambridgeshire
 Ely Hall, Vassar College, Poughkeepsie, New York, United States
 Ely Memorial High School, Ely, Minnesota, United States

People
 Ely (surname), a list of people
 Ely (given name), a list of people

Other uses
 , the name of more than one United States Navy ship
 Marquess of Ely, an extant title in the Peerage of Ireland
 Earl of Ely, three extinct titles in the Peerage of Ireland
 Ely House (disambiguation)
 Ely Racecourse, a racecourse in Cardiff, Wales

See also
 Liber Eliensis (sometimes titled Book of Ely), a 12th-century English chronicle and history
 Eli (disambiguation)
 Elie
 Eley (disambiguation)
 Ili (disambiguation)